Parage may refer to:

Parage (Bačka Palanka), a village in the Bačka Palanka municipality, in the Vojvodina province of Serbia
Paréage, a feudal institution that recognizes equality of rights and status between two rulers.  Also, equality in the portions of an inheritance